A Travelin' Man is a studio album by Slim Whitman, released in 1966 on Imperial Records.

Track listing

References 

1966 albums
Slim Whitman albums
Imperial Records albums